Rodrigo Nicolás Martínez (born 14 July 1992) is an Argentine footballer who plays as a forward for Deportivo Pampa Blanca.

Career
Martínez began his career in Primera B Nacional with Gimnasia y Esgrima. A goalless draw at home to Patronato on 18 March 2012 saw Martínez make his professional debut, coming on after seventy-five minutes for Marcos Pirchio. Two further appearances followed for the club. In June 2012, Martínez was loaned to Altos Hornos Zapla of Torneo Argentino B. He was selected eighteen times in 2012–13, with the forward scoring once. Martínez left Gimnasia y Esgrima permanently in 2013, signing for fourth tier Talleres. Moves to Atlético Chicoana and Progreso followed, either side of a stint back with Talleres.

He rejoined Talleres for a third time in late-2016, prior to appearing in Torneo Federal B for Deportivo Tabacal in 2017. One goal in sixteen appearances occurred as they finished sixth in Zona A Norte. Ahead of 2018, Martínez agreed to join Torneo Federal C's Deportivo Pampa Blanca.

Career statistics
.

References

External links

1992 births
Living people
Sportspeople from Jujuy Province
Argentine footballers
Association football forwards
Primera Nacional players
Torneo Argentino B players
Gimnasia y Esgrima de Jujuy footballers
Altos Hornos Zapla players
Talleres de Perico footballers